Mamie Creek is a stream in Pottawattamie County, Iowa, in the United States.

Mamie Creek was named for Ms. Mamie Cress, a pioneer who settled near it.

See also
List of rivers of Iowa

References

Rivers of Pottawattamie County, Iowa
Rivers of Iowa